New Jack City II is the sixth studio album by American rapper Bow Wow. It was released on March 31, 2009 through LBW Entertainment and Columbia Records. This is Bow Wow's first album to be released on his new label LBW Entertainment, and his first album to be receiving a parental advisory label for Adult Language. The production on the album was handled by Jermaine Dupri, LRoc, Nitti, T-Pain and Swizz Beatz among others. The album also features guest appearances from Swizz Beatz, Jermaine Dupri, Nelly, Trey Songz, T-Pain, Ron Browz, Dondria and T.I.

Background
Executive producer Jermaine Dupri based the album's title on the 1991 film New Jack City, feeling that the relationship between himself and Bow Wow was reminiscent of the rancorous but successful business partnership between Nino and Gee Money, the two main drug dealers in New Jack City, and that the album was like the continued success that those two characters could have had in a sequel if they had been able to resolve their differences peacefully.

There are 3 versions for this album released, which is a standard, a limited edition (including a Bonus DVD) and a Walmart version (which is only a clean edition, with three bonus tracks).

Singles
The lead single for his sixth album, "You Can Get It All", which features guest vocals from Johntá Austin, while it produced by Jermaine Dupri and Bryan-Michael Cox, was released. This track contains a sample of TLC's hit "Baby, Baby, Baby".

The album's promotional single, "Marco Polo", which features guest vocals by Soulja Boy Tell 'Em (who also latter produced the song), was released accompanying by a music video. The music video was shot and filmed at the Aquatic Park, outside of an Atlanta Suburb (known as Sun Valley Beach), in Paulding Co. GA. The music video premiered on the Soulja Boy Tell 'Em's YouTube page and was premiered via FNMTV on July 25, 2008.
The album's second promotional single, "Big Girls", accompanying by a music video, premiered on YouTube (which was released the day, after the release of "Marco Polo"). The complete version was released later on YouTube for some time, but then removed again for unknown reasons. There is no official date on the videos re-release.

The music video for "Roc The Mic", which features guest vocals by Jermaine Dupri (who also produced the song), was released. It was shot in Los Angeles, California near the Staples Center. The video for the song "You Can Get It All" featuring Johntá Austin and produced by Dupri was shot and filmed in Malibu, California and was later released. Both videos were directed by Hype Williams. A video was also filmed for "Pole In My Basement", with a strip club theme. It premiered on May 30, 2009 on Bow Wow's official YouTube page.

While he was on his tour bus, Bow Wow also made unofficial videos for his songs "Sunshine", "Like This" and "She's My".

Commercial performance
New Jack City II debuted at number 16 on the US Billboard 200, selling 31,000 copies in its first week. The album also debuted at number five on the US Top R&B/Hip-Hop Albums chart.

Track listing 
Credits adapted from iTunes, Amazon and Discogs.

Notes
 signifies a co-producer.
"What They Call Me" features uncredited vocals by Jermaine Dupri
"Sunshine" features backing vocals by Johntá Austin.

Sample credits
 "What They Call Me" contains a sample of "Big Time" performed by Rick James, written by James Calloway, Leroy Jackson and Aaron Davenport.
 "Roc the Mic" contains a sample of "La Di Da Di" performed by Doug E. Fresh, The Get Fresh Crew and Slick Rick, written by Douglas Davis and Ricky Walters; also contains interpolations of "Break Up to Make Up" performed by The Stylistics, written by Thomas Randolph Bell, Linda Epstein and Kenneth Gamble.
 "You Can Get It All" contains interpolations of "Baby-Baby-Baby" performed by TLC, written by Kenneth Edmonds, Antonio Reid and Daryl Simmons.
 "Sunshine" contains elements of "These Boots Are Made for Walkin'" performed by Nancy Sinatra, written by Lee Hazlewood.
 "Like This" contains interpolations of "Even When You Sleep" performed by The SOS Band, written by James Harris and Terry Lewis.
 "She's My" contains interpolations and a sample of "Roni" performed by Bobby Brown, written by Kenneth Edmonds and Darnell Bristol.

Personnel 

Managerial
Liz Hausle - marketing
Michael T. Mauldin - executive producer
Bow Wow - executive producer, A&R
Chad "Dr. Ceuss" Elliott - A&R
Juli Knapp - A&R

Performance credits
Johntá Austin - vocals, background vocals
Dondria - vocals

Visuals and imagery
Mark Mann - photography
Chris Feldmann - art director, design
Chrystal Streets - stylist

Instruments
Julio Miranda - guitar
Eric "E Live" Florence - bass guitar
David "Preach" Bal4 - keyboard

Technical and production
Dave Kutch - mastering
Jermaine Dupri - production, vocal production, mixing
Nitti - production
Lamar "Mars" Edwards - production
T.I. - production
T-Pain - production
Drumma Boy - production
Swizz Beatz - production
LRoc - co-production
Elliott Carter - engineering, recording
Aaron Holton - engineering
John Horesco IV - engineering
 Alonzo Vargas - recording engineer
Eddie "Shyboogs" Timmons - engineering, recording
Javier Valverda - engineering, recording
Miles Walker - engineering, recording
Jordan "DJ Swivel" Young - engineering, recording
Josh Gudwin - vocal engineering
Phil Tan - mixing
Leslie Brathwaite - mixing
John Frye - mixing
Fabian Marasciullo - mixing
Ray Seay - mixing
DURO - mixing
John Horesco IV - recording
David Bench - assistant
Carlos Oyanedel - assistant
Josh Houghkirk	- assistant
Ghazi Hourani - assistant
Kegan Houston - assistant

Charts

Weekly charts

Year-end charts

References

External links
Official website
YouTube channel

2009 albums
Bow Wow (rapper) albums
Albums produced by Jermaine Dupri
Albums produced by Swizz Beatz
Albums produced by Ron Browz
Albums produced by No I.D.
Albums produced by DJ Toomp
Albums produced by Drumma Boy
Albums produced by T-Pain
Columbia Records albums
Albums produced by Mars (record producer)